Kathryn Mary Pinnock, Baroness Pinnock (born 25 September 1946) is a British Liberal Democrat politician, life peer, and former school teacher. Since 1987, she has been a member of Kirklees Metropolitan Borough Council. She was leader of the council's Lib Dem group from 1991 to 2014, and leader of the council from 2000 to 2006. She was created a life peer in 2014 and now sits in the House of Lords.

Early life
Pinnock was born on 25 September 1946. She attended the girls' grammar school, the City of Bath Girls' School (now the Hayesfield Girls' School).

She studied history and chemistry at Keele University, graduating with a bachelor's degree. She remained at Keele to complete a teaching diploma.

Early career
Following university, Pinnock became a secondary school teacher. She taught history in schools in Birmingham and Special Needs Maths at Rastrick High School in West Yorkshire. She also served as Deputy Chief Examiner for A-Level History for a number of years.

Political career

Local government
Since 1987, she has been a local councillor, representing Cleckheaton on the Kirklees Council. She was leader of the Lib Dem group on the council between 1991 and 2014. She was leader of the council from 2000 to 2006, and was the first female to hold this post.

House of Lords
In August 2014, it was announced that she was to be made a life peer. She was created a life peer on 23 September 2014 taking the title Baroness Pinnock, of Cleckheaton in the County of West Yorkshire. Since June 2015, she has been a member of the Home Affairs Sub-Committee of the European Union Committee.

In 2015, Pinnock was appointed the Spokesperson for Children for the Lib Dems, and in October 2016 she was appointed their Shadow Secretary of State for Communities and Local Government.

Honours
In July 2015, Pinnock was awarded an honorary doctorate by the University of Huddersfield.

References

Living people
Alumni of Keele University
Councillors in Kirklees
1946 births
Schoolteachers from Yorkshire
Life peeresses created by Elizabeth II
Leaders of local authorities of England
Liberal Democrats (UK) councillors
Liberal Democrats (UK) life peers
People from Bath, Somerset
Place of birth missing (living people)
Women councillors in England
Schoolteachers from the West Midlands